Gary Taphouse is a football commentator from Bournemouth, England. He mainly works for Sky Sports and Premier League Productions.

He has worked for Sky Sports since 2005 and commentates on English Premier League matches for Sky Sports' Match Choice programme throughout the football season. He also covers live EFL matches. In the past his voice has been heard on MLS games, League Cup ties, La Liga matches, World Cup qualifiers and Champions League matches for the channel.

Taphouse commentated for talkSPORT radio from 2014–2019. He was part of their commentary team for the FA Cup, the 2014 FIFA World Cup in Brazil, the 2016 UEFA European Championship in France and the 2018 FIFA World Cup in Russia.

He also commentates for PLP, who supply overseas broadcasters with TV coverage of the Premier League. In addition he works for Gravity Media and Pitch International, who supply world feed commentaries on such competitions as the FA Cup, League Cup and UEFA Champions League.

In the past he has worked for the likes of Capital Radio and the GMG Radio group. Before that he had some print and online experience and worked for football analysts Opta.

He is active on Twitter (@garytaphouse) and is followed by many sports media professionals because of the large number of industry-specific vacancies he posts on his timeline.

He has also commentated on FIFA esports tournaments and has hosted football-related charity events.

References

1975 births
English association football commentators
English male journalists
Living people
People educated at Whitgift School
Alumni of Bournemouth University